Molas Pass, elevation , is a high mountain pass in the San Juan Mountains of western Colorado in the United States.

The pass is in the San Juan National Forest. It is traversed by the Million Dollar Highway, U.S. Highway 550 south of Silverton, which is part of the San Juan Skyway Scenic Byway.

Though it is one of the higher passes in Colorado, it has only a few switchbacks on the north approach, is considerably less intimidating than Red Mountain Pass on the same highway. It is generally kept open in the winter months.

Molas Pass is also the last mountain pass of the Iron Horse Bicycle Classic race, where riders race the train from Durango to Silverton.

See also
 U.S. Route 550 in Colorado

References

Gallery

Mountain passes of Colorado
Landforms of San Juan County, Colorado
San Juan Mountains (Colorado)
San Juan National Forest
Transportation in San Juan County, Colorado
U.S. Route 50